The 1992 Lion Cup was the tenth edition of the Lion Cup, the premier domestic rugby union knock-out competition in South Africa.

Teams

22 South African provincial teams took part in this competition.

Three teams - ,  and  – withdrew following a merger between all the governing bodies of rugby in South Africa.

Competition

This competition was a knock-out competition. The top ten ranked teams had a bye in Round One, while the teams ranked 11 to 22 played each other, with the winners progressing to Round Two. Those sixteen teams then played a straight knockout competition until the final.

Fixtures and results

Initially, the competition was scheduled to run from 21 February to 25 July. However, due to fixture congestion it was initially indicated that the competition would be scrapped.

In July 1992, it was announced that the competition would indeed take place and would run from September to October.

The fixtures were as follows:

Round one

Round two

Quarter-finals

Semi-finals

Final

References

1992
1992 in South African rugby union
1992 rugby union tournaments for clubs